The brown-dotted clothes moth (Niditinea fuscella) is a species of tineoid moth. It belongs to the fungus moth family (Tineidae), and therein to the nominate subfamily Tineinae. It is (under its junior synonym Tinea fuscipunctella) the type species of its genus Niditinea.

It is widespread and common in much of the western Palearctic (except for outlying islands, e.g. Iceland, and cold regions such as the far north of Scotland), but has also been introduced elsewhere (e.g. in Australia and New Zealand). The adult moths are on the wing around May to September, depending on the location; they are not fond of bright daylight and will only come out in the late afternoon.

Adults of this small moth have a wingspan of 14 mm. They are of a rather dull coloration, with brown-grey forewings that bear three large blackish-brown dots each. The hindwings are a silvery white; they are surrounded by a long-haired fringe, as usual for fungus moths and relatives. The body is dull brown, and the head bears a tuft of reddish-brown hair. 

The caterpillars feed on dry animal and plant remains. Despite the species' common name, they are rarely recorded as a pest of clothing. Though they will eat discarded wool and similar fabrics, they are more commonly found in bird nests – particularly of chicken (Gallus gallus domesticus), domestic pigeon (Columba livia domestica), swallows (Hirundinidae) and woodpeckers (Picidae) –, where they feed on shed feathers and feces. Less usual foodstuffs of this species are dry peas and dried fruit, bran, dry rose flowers, the dead beetles in mealworm (Tenebrio molitor) cultures and even pigskin bookbindings.

Synonyms
Invalid scientific names (junior synonyms and others) of the brown-dotted clothes moth are:
 Niditinea frigidella (Packard, 1867)
 Niditinea fuscipunctella (Haworth, 1828)
 Niditinea griseella (Chambers, 1873)
 Niditinea ignotella (Walker, 1864) (non Walker 1863: preoccupied)
 Niditinea nubilipennella (Clemens, 1859)
 Niditinea spretella (Denis & Schiffermüller, 1775)
 Oecophora frigidella Packard, 1867
 Tinea abligatella Walker, 1863
 Tinea crinitella Schrank, 1802
 Tinea distans Gozmány, 1959
 Tinea eurinella Zagulajev, 1952
 Tinea fuscella Linnaeus, 1758
 Tinea fuscipunctella Haworth, 1828	
 Tinea griseella Chambers, 1873
 Tinea ignotella Walker, 1864 (non Walker 1863: preoccupied)
 Tinea nubilipennella Clemens, 1859
 Tinea spretella Denis & Schiffermüller, 1775

N. spretella is sometimes still considered a distinct species, but most recent authors include it here.

Footnotes

References

 Australian Biological Resources Study (ABRS) (2008): Australian Faunal Directory – Niditinea fuscella. Version of 2008-OCT-09. Retrieved 2010-MAY-05.
 Fauna Europaea (FE) (2009): Niditinea fuscella. Version 2.1, 2009-DEC-22. Retrieved 2010-MAY-05.
 Grabe, Albert (1942): Eigenartige Geschmacksrichtungen bei Kleinschmetterlingsraupen ["Strange tastes among micromoth caterpillars"]. Zeitschrift des Wiener Entomologen-Vereins 27: 105-109 [in German]. PDF fulltext
 Kimber, Ian [2010]: UKMoths – Niditinea fuscella. Retrieved 2010-MAY-05.
 Pitkin, Brian & Jenkins, Paul (2004): Butterflies and Moths of the World, Generic Names and their Type-species – Niditinea. Version of 2004-NOV-05. Retrieved 2010-MAY-05.
 Robinson, Gaden S. [2010]: Global Taxonomic Database of Tineidae (Lepidoptera) – Niditinea fuscella. Retrieved 2010-MAY-05.
 Savela, Markku (2009): Markku Savela's Lepidoptera and some other life forms – Niditinea. Version of 2003-DEC-28. Retrieved 2010-MAY-05.

External links
 Lepiforum de
 Lepidoptera of Belgium

Tineinae
Moths described in 1758
Taxa named by Carl Linnaeus
Moths of Africa
Moths of Europe
Moths of Seychelles
Moths of New Zealand
Moths of Asia